A cross whose arms end in arrowheads is called a "cross barby" or "cross barbée" in the traditional terminology of heraldry.  In Christian use, the ends of this cross resemble the barbs of fish hooks, or fish spears.  This alludes to the Ichthys symbol of Christ, and is suggestive of the "fishers of men" theme in the Gospel.

In modern use, the symbol has become associated with extremist organisations after the Arrow Cross (Nyilaskereszt) symbol was used in Hungary in the 1930s and 1940s as the symbol of a far-right Hungarist fascist political party, the Arrow Cross Party, led by Ferenc Szálasi, and of this party's thuggish paramilitary organization.  The symbol consists of two green double-ended arrows in a cross configuration on a white circular background. The arrow cross symbol remains outlawed in Hungary.

A similar symbol, the Crosstar, is used by the Nationalist Movement, a white supremacist group based in the United States.  

Arrow cross previously used by the Falange Venezolana (Venezuelan Phalanx), a far-right group based in Venezuela.

See also
 Greek cross
Arrow (symbol)
The Six Arrows
Three Arrows
Symbol of Chaos

References

Christian crosses
Fascism in Hungary
Fascist symbols